Jacob Pieter "Jaap" Leemhuis (4 December 1941 – 19 September 2014) was a field hockey player from the Netherlands. He competed  at the 1960 and 1964 Summer Olympics, where his team finished in ninth and seventh place, respectively. He played 61 international matches before retiring in 1964. After that he worked for Shell, mostly outside the Netherlands. He was the chair of Haren en Snaren, an organization that helps young classical musicians from Eastern Europe.

References

External links
 

1941 births
2014 deaths
Dutch male field hockey players
Field hockey players at the 1960 Summer Olympics
Field hockey players at the 1964 Summer Olympics
Olympic field hockey players of the Netherlands
People from De Bilt
Sportspeople from Utrecht (province)
20th-century Dutch people